Fabinho is a Portuguese given name, a diminutive form of the Portuguese name "little Fábio". Portuguese also has an augmentative form of the name, Fabão, "big Fábio".

Brazilian football 
 Fabinho Santos (born 1973), born Fábio José dos Santos, football manager and former midfielder in 1995 with Vitorio
 Fabinho (footballer, born 1974), born Fabio Augusto Justino, former forward with Shimizu S-Pulse in 1999
 Fabinho (footballer, born 1975), born Fábio de Souza, football manager and former defender with FC Wil in 2002
 Fabinho (footballer, born 1976), born Fábio de Jesus, former defensive midfielder with Santos in 2005
 Fabinho (footballer, born 1977), born Fábio Trinidade da Silveira, former forward with Randers in 2005
 Fabinho (footballer, born 1980), born Fábio Alves Félix, former midfielder
 Fabinho Recife (born 1982), born Fabiano Aguiar Dionizio Laurentino, former forward with Sport Recife in 2001
 Fabinho (footballer, born 1982), born Fábio de Matos Pereira, former midfielder
 Fabinho (footballer, born 1983), born Fabio Souza dos Santos, forward for Juventus SC
 Fabinho Capixaba (born 1983), born Antônio Fábio Francês Cavalcante, former right-back
 Fabinho (footballer, born 1984), born Fábio Augusto Machado, Brazilian football midfielder
 Fabinho (footballer, born 1985), born Fábio Alves Macedo, former left-back
 Fabinho (footballer, born 1986), born Fábio Gonçalves, defensive midfielder for Ceará 
 Fabinho Alves (born 1986), born Fábio da Silva Alves, striker for Ipatinga
 Fabinho (footballer, born 1991), born Fábio Ayres, forward for Nova Iguaçu
 Fabinho (footballer, born 1992), born Fabio da Silva Santos, forward for Santos–AP
 Fabinho (footballer, born 1993), born Fábio Henrique Tavares, defensive midfielder for Liverpool
 Fabinho (footballer, born 1996), born Fábio Alexander Freitas de Almeida, central midfielder
 Fabinho (footballer, born 1999), born Fabio Augusto Luciano da Silva, midfielder for São Paulo
 Fabinho (footballer, born 2002), born Fábio Silva de Freitas, midfielder for Palmeiras

Other football 
 Fábio Baptista (born 2001), Portuguese football player
 Fabinho Azevedo (1977–2018), born Fábio Pereira de Azevedo, Togolese former forward
 Fábio Lima (futsal player) (born 1988), Portuguese futsal player
 Fabinho Martins (born 1996), born Fábio Alexandre Cruz Martins, Portuguese midfielder for Alverca

Portuguese masculine given names